Barry Beitzel (born 20 December 1934) is a former Australian rules footballer who played for the Carlton Football Club in the Victorian Football League (VFL).

Notes

External links 

Barry Beitzel's profile at Blueseum

1934 births
Carlton Football Club players
Living people
Australian rules footballers from Victoria (Australia)